The 1924 Philadelphia Athletics season involved the A's finishing fifth in the American League with a record of 71 wins and 81 losses.

Offseason 
 December 11, 1923: Harry O'Neill, Hank Hulvey, Pinky Pittenger and $35,000 were traded by the Athletics to the Salt Lake City Bees for Paul Strand.
 December 15, 1923: Wid Matthews, Heinie Scheer, and $40,000 were traded by the Athletics to the Milwaukee Brewers for Al Simmons.

Regular season

Season standings

Record vs. opponents

Notable transactions 
 July 1924: Jimmie Foxx was purchased by the Athletics from the Easton Farmers.

Roster

Player stats

Batting

Starters by position 
Note: Pos = Position; G = Games played; AB = At bats; H = Hits; Avg. = Batting average; HR = Home runs; RBI = Runs batted in

Other batters 
Note: G = Games played; AB = At bats; H = Hits; Avg. = Batting average; HR = Home runs; RBI = Runs batted in

Pitching

Starting pitchers 
Note: G = Games pitched; IP = Innings pitched; W = Wins; L = Losses; ERA = Earned run average; SO = Strikeouts

Other pitchers 
Note: G = Games pitched; IP = Innings pitched; W = Wins; L = Losses; ERA = Earned run average; SO = Strikeouts

Relief pitchers 
Note: G = Games pitched; W = Wins; L = Losses; SV = Saves; ERA = Earned run average; SO = Strikeouts

References

External links
1924 Philadelphia Athletics at Baseball Reference
1924 Philadelphia Athletics at Baseball Almanac

Oakland Athletics seasons
Philadelphia Athletics season
Oakland